Albert Mbano (born 30 November 1969) is a retired Zimbabwean football striker.

References

1969 births
Living people
Zimbabwean footballers
Zimbabwe international footballers
Black Rhinos F.C. players
CAPS United players
Association football forwards